Kaseko is a musical genre from Suriname. It is a fusion of numerous popular and folk styles derived from Africa, Europe and the Americas. 

The genre is rhythmically complex, with percussion instruments including skratji (a very large bass drum) and snare drums, as well as saxophone, trumpet and occasionally trombone. Singing can be both solo and choir. Songs are typically call-and-response, as are Creole folk styles from the area, such as kawina.

Etymology 
The term Kaseko may be derived from Kasékò, a Guianan creole dance.

History 
Kaseko emerged from the traditional Afro-Surinamese kawina music, which was played since the beginning of 1900 by street musicians in Paramaribo. It evolved in the 1930s during festivities that used large bands, especially brass bands, and was called Bigi Poku ("big drum music"). In the late 1940s, jazz, calypso and other importations became popular, while rock and roll soon left its own influence in the form of electrified instruments.

In the 1970s, Surinamese expatriates living in the Netherlands, such as Lieve Hugo and Ewald Krolis, popularized kaseko.

References

External links
https://web.archive.org/web/20100514061941/http://lievehugo.com/
http://www.kingbotho.com
http://www.srananpoku.com/browse-kaseko-videos-1-date.html

Surinamese music
Fusion music genres
Dance in Suriname